Wooden Shoes is a 1917 American silent drama film directed by Raymond B. West and starring Bessie Barriscale, Jack Livingston, and Joseph J. Dowling.

Cast

Production 
Village scenes were filmed on the lot of Triangle Studio in Culver City, California. The village set was later used for In Slumberland (1917) and the Bessie Love film Wee Lady Betty (1917).

Preservation
With no prints of Wooden Shoes in any film archives, it is a lost film.

References

External links

1917 films
1917 drama films
1910s English-language films
American silent feature films
Silent American drama films
American black-and-white films
Films directed by Raymond B. West
Triangle Film Corporation films
1917 lost films
Lost drama films
1910s American films